Jana Novotná and Jim Pugh were the defending champions and won in the final 6–3, 6–4 against Zina Garrison and Sherwood Stewart.

Seeds
Champion seeds are indicated in bold text while text in italics indicates the round in which those seeds were eliminated.

Draw

Final

Top half

Bottom half

References
 1989 Australian Open – Doubles draws and results at the International Tennis Federation

Mixed Doubles
1989